"Maybach Music 2" is a hip-hop song recorded by American rapper Rick Ross and released as the third single from his third studio album, Deeper Than Rap. The song features Kanye West, T-Pain, and Lil Wayne.

The single peaked at number 92 on the Billboard Hot 100 and number 54 on the Billboard Hot R&B/Hip-Hop Songs chart. The single was released on May 19, 2009.

The song was first leaked on March 28, 2009 on the unofficial Lil Wayne mixtape My Face Can't Be Felt.

Background
The song is the sequel to "Maybach Music" featuring Jay-Z off of Rick Ross's 2008 album Trilla. The official remix was made called "Maybach Music 2.5", it features DJ Khaled, T-Pain, Pusha T, Birdman, & Fabolous. In May 2010 a response to this song was by Jay-Z was leaked online. In his version, he speaks about being left off the original "Maybach Music 2". Rappers French Montana and Busta Rhymes also made their own remixes.

Music video 
A music video for the remix (titled "Maybach Music 2.5") was released January 4, 2010. The song only featured T-Pain, Pusha T & Rick Ross. Fabolous, DJ Khaled & Birdman were not in the video for unknown reasons.

Charts

References

2009 singles
Rick Ross songs
Kanye West songs
T-Pain songs
Lil Wayne songs
Songs written by Lil Wayne
Songs written by T-Pain
Songs written by Kanye West
Songs written by Rick Ross
Maybach Music Group singles
2009 songs
Song recordings produced by J.U.S.T.I.C.E. League
Songs written by Erik Ortiz
Songs written by Kevin Crowe